Qute Corporation is a Japanese video game company founded in 1999. Apart from game development, they offer technology consultancy in other areas such as health care or graphic design.

Games

References

External links
  

Amusement companies of Japan
Video game companies of Japan
Video game development companies
Video game companies established in 1999
Japanese companies established in 1999